Spyridon Mavrogenis Pasha, in Turkish known as Ispiro Mavroyani, was a Phanariot Greek doctor who was the physician of Abdul Hamid II, Sultan of the Ottoman Empire.
Constantinos Trompoukis and John Lascaratos described him as "a prolific scholar".

He was fluent in Greek, French, and German.

History
A member of the Mavrogheni family, his great-grandfather was Petros Mavrogenis. His father died when he was young, so he lived with his uncle, Ioannis Mavrogenis, who was living in Vienna as the chargé d'affairs of the local Ottoman mission. He had studied at the Chalcis Commercial School prior to living with his uncle and at a medical studies programme in Vienna from 1835-1843. He initially remained in that city, working in city-owned hospital as an auxiliary doctor. He came back to Constantinople in 1845.

Whilst back in Turkey, he became a doctor in the Artillery Hospital, and then, beginning in 1848, a professor at the Imperial Medical School. He initially taught hygiene, and later pathology. There he advocated for French as a medium of instruction. He held meetings of the Greek Literary Society, created in 1861, at his house.

His son, Alexandros Mavrogenis, was a diplomat. George Anogianakis, author of "Reflections of Western Thinking on Nineteenth-Century Ottoman Thought: A Critique of the 'Hard-Problem' by Spyridon Mavrogenis, a Nineteenth Century Physiologist," wrote that the fact his son had such a coveted job "is indicative of Mavrogenis' influence". When his relationship with Abdul Hamid deteriorated, his son lost his envoy job.

Works

 "The Life of Constantine Caratheodory" (Βίος Κωνσταντίνος Καραθεοδωρή). Gauthier-Villars (Paris), 1885. 
 Mavrogenis was a friend of Caratheodory,  who was a founder and member of the literary society, and the biography was issued for a 7 January 1880 celebration. As the Ottoman authorities censored works published domestically, this biography was published abroad. Caratheodory's older son asked Mavrogenis to add two narrations, one about a presentation by Caratheodory at the Medical Academy of Paris and one about an account of Mahmud II's death deriving from a pamphlet edited by Caratheodory. Mavrogenis edited the biography five years after the initial publication.

He also wrote an entry in "Treatises of Physiology".

Honours
In the title page of his monograph on Constantin Carathéodory, his titles are stated:
 Senator
 Order of Osmaniye, 1st class
 Order of Medjidie, 1st class,
 Knight of the Order of Distinction
 Grand Cross of the Austro-Hungarian Order of the Iron Crown
 Grand Cross of the Swedish Order of Vasa
 Persian Order of the Lion and the Sun, 1st class
 Commander of the Belgian Order of Leopold

Notes

Footnotes

References

Sources
 Anogianakis, George. "Reflections of Western Thinking on Nineteenth-Century Ottoman Thought: A Critique of the 'Hard-Problem' by Spyridon Mavrogenis, a Nineteenth Century Physiologist" (Chapter 6). In: Smith, C.U.M. (Aston University) and Harry Whitaker (Northern Michigan University) (editors). Brain, Mind and Consciousness in the History of Neuroscience. Springer Science and Business, 23 April 2014. , 9789401787741.
  - First published November 1, 2003.

Further reading
  - Available at Academia.edu

External links
 Βίος Κωνσταντίνου του Καραθεοδωρή : Ψηφίσματι του εν Κωνσταντινουπόλει Ελληνικού Φιλολογικού Συλλόγου / συνταγείς και εκφωνηθείς παρ' αυτού εν Συνεδριάσει του εν Κ. Π. Ελλ. Φιλολογικού Συλλόγου υπό Σπυρίδωνος του Μαυρογένους ___. (Biography of Constantine Caratheodory) 

19th-century physicians from the Ottoman Empire
Phanariotes
Greeks from the Ottoman Empire
Pashas
Court physicians
19th-century Greek physicians
Spyridon
Recipients of the Order of the Medjidie, 1st class
Members of the Senate of the Ottoman Empire
Grand Crosses of the Order of Vasa
Physicians from Istanbul